Huanglong may refer to:

Yellow Dragon, Chinese mythology

Places
Huanglong County, Yan'an, Shaanxi
Huanglong Scenic and Historic Interest Area, scenic area in Songpan County, Sichuan
Jiuzhai Huanglong Airport, an airport in Songpan County, Sichuan
Yellow Dragon Sports Center, Hangzhou, Zhejiang

Towns
Huanglong, Anhui, in Huaining County, Anhui
Huanglong, Shiyan, in Zhangwan District, Shiyan, Hubei
Huanglong, Xiangyang, in Xiangyang, Hubei
Huanglong, Xinning, in Xinning County, Hunan
Huanglong, Dayu County, in Dayu County, Jiangxi

Townships
Huanglong Township, Xiushui County, in Xiushui County, Jiangxi
Huanglong Township, Guangyuan, in Guangyuan, Sichuan
Huanglong Township, Ngawa Tibetan and Qiang Autonomous Prefecture, in Songpan County, Sichuan
Huanglong Township, Yuechi County, a township in Yuechi County, Sichuan
Huanglong Township, Zhejiang, in Shengsi County, Zhejiang

Historical eras
Huanglong (49BC), an era name used by Emperor Xuan of Han
Huanglong (229–231), an era name used by Sun Quan, emperor of Eastern Wu

See also
 Hoàng Long (disambiguation)